Oliver Island may refer to:

 Oliver Island (Antarctica)
 Oliver Island (Western Australia)